Obering is a surname. Notable people with the surname include:

 Henry Obering (born 1951), American general
 Mary Obering (1937–2022), American painter